Nemesio Isip Yabut (December 19, 1925–February 25, 1986) was a Filipino politician and businessman who served as Mayor of Makati from 1972 until his death in 1986.

Early life and education
Nemesio Yabut was born on December 19, 1925 in Makati (formerly a part of Rizal) to Fabian Yabut and Irene Isip. He was the fourth of five children. His father was a soldier. He studied elementary at the Fort McKinley Elementary School, a school for the U.S. Army dependents. Fabian Yabut died ten years after his birth, and Yabut was moved to Guadalupe Nuevo Elementary School (now Nemesio I. Yabut Elementary School) and he studied there.

When the World War II broke out, he helped his family by doing odd jobs. After the end of the war. Yabut wanted to resume his education, but he was too poor to pay for this. He joined the Makati Police force as a sergeant.

Business career

Yabut formed the Guaranteed Commercial Delivery Services Inc. (Guacods Inc.) in 1959. This business was success, and in 1960, Yabut and his company won a bid for a warehouse in a pier zone.

Political career
In 1969, Yabut ran for congressman of the first district of Rizal, but lost. Two years later, in 1971, he elected as mayor of Makati, and he took office on the first day of 1972. He was the member of the Kilusang Bagong Lipunan and was an ally of former President Ferdinand Marcos. In 1980, Yabut was reelected in the same position. 

From 1978 to 1986, he was appointed as chairman of the Philippine Racing Commission.

Personal life
Yabut was married to Corrine Siddons; they had seven children including Arturo "Toro" Yabut, Makati City Vice Mayor from 1992 to 1998, and former 2nd District Councilor Nemesio Yabut Jr, who served from 2010 to 2019.

Death and legacy
On February 7, 1986, the day of the snap elections, Yabut became ill and he was admitted to a hospital in his municipality. He died at 1:30am on February 25, 1986 (the last day of the People Power Revolution). He was succeeded by Jejomar Binay as Officer-in-Charge (OIC) two days later, on February 27, 1986.

The Guadalupe Nuevo Elementary School, where Yabut studied, was renamed as Nemesio I. Yabut Elementary School. Nemesio I. Yabut Senior High School was founded in 2016.

References

1925 births
1986 deaths
20th-century Filipino politicians
20th-century Filipino businesspeople
Kilusang Bagong Lipunan politicians
Mayors of Makati